The EastEnders theme tune was composed by Simon May. Leslie Osborne has a contractual composer credit, but did not contribute to the composition or recording.

The theme, which is written in the key of E-flat major, is largely based upon percussion instrument, strings and the piano. It is widely known for its dramatic use of sound, particularly the drums that begin at the end of an episode – which adds a sense of importance, suspense and drama to the cliff-hanger. This in itself, has been parodied and used by television shows since, such as in a Friends spoof that featured on SMTV Live. The drum fill was written and played by Graham Broad.

The theme has become widely recognised. A 2008 poll by PRS for Music cited it as the most recognisable piece of music in the UK, beating the National anthem "God Save the Queen".

The theme tune was nominated for an Ivor Novello Awards in 1985 for Best TV Theme and in 1987 it won the Television and Radio Industries Club Award for Best TV Theme Music.

Inception

Composer Simon May was introduced to Associated Television executive Leslie Osborne in 1976. Several years later, in 1982, Osborne introduced May to television producer Gerard Glaister; consequently, May was commissioned to write the themes to Skorpion and Cold Warrior. Writer Tony Holland, was impressed with May's work on Cold Warrior, and got in touch with the composer through Osborne.
 May met with Julia Smith and Tony Holland, who were developing a new soap opera for BBC One, then titled E8 (which was later renamed EastEnders). May was told that EastEnders was going to be an edgy drama, and came up with a piece of music that reflected that, but it was rejected because it was too dark. Producers wanted something melodic, "to bring people in from the kitchen or garden", and wanted it be "more feel-good" to contrast with the actual programme. May looked at his Cockney friends and felt they were "warm and loyal" people, so said his inspiration came from "my subliminal understanding of what the Cockney character is about." He offered an attempt that conveyed everything about the East End that the producers wanted; "bells, whistles, hand-claps, sitars, steelpan and an underlying feel of being on a merry-go-round."

The theme was composed solely by May. Executive Leslie Osborne was given a 'writer' credit because he was responsible for "getting the gig", but May says that he "didn't write a single note". May says, "I could have possibly have insisted on retaining the copyright of EastEnders for myself, but if I had done so, I would have probably have lost the Howards' Way commission." May actually began writing the music that was used for the theme tune when he was seven years old, around 34 years before EastEnders first aired, and based it on the scales that his music teacher had taught him.

The drum beats at the start of the theme tune were played by May's drummer, Graham Broad. May had originally composed a longer theme that featured a section in "a true cockney piano-type style" and he asked Broad for a drum "fill" to allow the theme to switch back to the main version. Smith and Holland heard it and assumed it was for the end titles. The drum beats are commonly known as the "doof doofs" or "duff duffs" and it is used to signify a cliffhanger at the end of an episode, commonly known as a "duff duff moment", for which the camera focuses on the face of the actor receiving the "duff duff moment" for around four seconds.

All of the chords used in the piece of music are diatonic and chromatic, with no diatonic and chromatic alterations; it has been said that this "adds to the directness of the music". The main melody is scored for a piano, which has been described as having a "pub sing-a-long feel" to it. The tune is also doubled by a whistle, and there are two rhythmic permeations, a dotted quarter note-eighth note moving the music forward, and a two-quaver hand-clap on the fourth beat of every other bar.

Title music and hits

The original title music was used until 1991. A stereo version was introduced in 1988 for Omnibus editions, although it was mainly used for 4 months in 1991 before a new version came into use, sounding much more similar to the original, this version having a slightly different ending.

On 11 May 1993, a completely new recording was instated which was jazzier than the previous version. The famous "doof doofs" were significantly tweaked. This version of the music proved unpopular but was used on screen for 11 months.

From 11 April 1994, the synth drums that preceded the closing theme were added to the beginning of the opening theme. The new theme at the time was a version based on the original, with more up to date elements. This was the longest-lasting version to date, being used for 15 years before another revamp took place.

From 7 September 2009, the theme tune was rescored by May to include stronger drum beats and more background percussion.

The theme has also been remixed into a much slower and less dramatic version for use with EastEnders Revealed and a rock version for use with EastEnders Xtra. Subsequent spin-offs Ricky & Bianca, Perfectly Frank and EastEnders: Slaters in Detention have used the softer guitar version. 2010 internet spin-off EastEnders: E20 features a new remix of the theme tune, which was chosen by producer Deborah Sathe, executive producer Diederick Santer, Simon May, director Michael Keillor and BBC Radio 1Xtra's DJ Ace from entries in a competition launched on Annie Mac's BBC Radio 1 show. The winner was announced on 4 December 2009 as Carl Darling.

DJ Osymyso—known for remixing popular culture—produced a mashup version of the theme, which turned the infamous fight between Peggy Mitchell and Pat Butcher into a breakbeat dance track. The theme was part of a routine by stand-up comedy Bill Bailey during his Bewilderness shows. Bailey describes how depressing he finds the theme and imagines lyrics he feels are fitting: "Everyone is going to die/We're all gonna die/In a variety of different ways". He then proceeds to supply an alternative version of the theme which he feels is more appropriate, embodying the multicultural nature of the East End of London by using mode, sitar and tabla. In 2009, American alternative metal band Faith No More performed the theme tune at the Reading and Leeds Festivals.

Songs 
In 1986, the lyricist Don Black added lyrics to the tune to create the song "Anyone Can Fall in Love". It was recorded in 1986 by EastEnders cast member Anita Dobson who portrayed Angie Watts in the show. It reached number four on the UK Singles Chart, and Dobson appeared on Top of the Pops. Marti Webb, who recorded "Always There", May's theme to Howards' Way, covered "Anyone Can Fall in Love" on her album Always There.

In 1988, the tune had another set of lyrics added to produce a hymn called "Glory Be To God On High", which was performed on the BBC's Songs of Praise.

The 1993 "jazzy" arrangement spawned another vocal version (Sharon Benson's "I'll Always Believe in You").

In 2010 in the lead up to the shows 25th silver anniversary, Patsy Palmer (Bianca) Sid Owen (Ricky) appeared on the Alan Carr show for an interview and decided to have an old "Knees up" round the piano to do their own version of "Anyone Can Fall In Love" which proved to be popular with the audience. Including a glass statue "Wellard" singing along.

Other versions 
A medley of the theme songs from EastEnders and Howards' Way was recorded by The Shadows and reached No. 86 on the UK singles chart in December 1986. A jazzy swing music version was used for the 1988 spinoff CivvyStreet.

According to PRS for Music it has 99 different recordings of the EastEnders theme tune registered on its system.

Julia's Theme

"Julia's Theme" refers to an alternative version of the usual theme, which was named after one of the show's creators, Julia Smith. It has been used in place of the regular theme 68 times as of 17 March 2022. This theme sees a change to the way an episode ends. Normally an episode ends with drums which are known to many as "doof doofs" or "duff duffs". Julia's Theme, created for gentle or romantic endings, ends an episode with a slow buildup played on piano, usually for a particularly emotional event. When Julia's Theme played for the first time in 1985, it was over the final moments of a gentle scene between Ian Beale and his grandmother Lou Beale. The first full-length version of the theme was heard in the 3 October 1985 episode where Michelle Fowler tells Den Watts that she is pregnant with his unborn baby and the pair agree to keep the child's paternity secret.

There have been a few variations of the music used during its run, the original used regularly between 1985 until 1987 before being used in 1992 and once in 1993, and a final time in 1996. An updated version of this theme was introduced in 2001 and lasted until 2006. The third version of this theme was introduced with minor changes in 2010 and is still used in present endings. A different variation was introduced in 1995 and was used until 2008 before a revamped version was used from 2009 onwards.

Simon May's 1984 memo to the producers giving a breakdown of the various versions of the theme he had prepared refers to this as the "romantic pre-empt". The full version of the theme was featured on the B side of the original 1985 BBC theme tune 45 and also included on the compilation album Simon's Way the following year.

Episodes where Julia's theme has been used

Additionally a slightly distorted version of the theme plays in "The Ghosts of Ian Beale", a Children in Need 2014 special (14 November 2014), when Lucy Beale (Hetti Bywater) leaves and walks into the white light during her father Ian Beale's (Adam Woodyatt) concussion-induced dream. It does not lead onto the end of the episode.

Alternative endings
Occasionally, singular episodes of EastEnders have used a different theme tune for the closing credits, or the initial drum beats are missing or have been replaced by something else, or even lacked music entirely.

Kathy's Theme
Used on Friday 10 April 1998 as Kathy Mitchell (Gillian Taylforth) leaves Albert Square behind for a new life in South Africa. As she departed London City Airport with Phil looking on, the theme started and Kathy took one final look at the place she called home, the East End of London.

Peggy's Theme

"Peggy's Theme" is a variation of Julia's Theme, written by Simon May. It was featured in Barbara Windsor's farewell episode as Peggy Mitchell, transmitted on 10 September 2010, where it replaced the entire theme tune, unlike Julia's Theme which only replaces the drum beats. The introduction of the theme has since been used on a number of occasions in place of the usual Julia's Theme, only replacing the drum beats. The full "Peggy's Theme" was used again at the end of the episode dated 19 May 2016 as her son Phil Mitchell (Steve McFadden) reads the letter from Peggy following her death, and again on 4 July 2016 as Phil says his final goodbye to Peggy following her funeral.

"Peggy's Theme" features on the album The Simon May Collection and was also released as an EP along with other EastEnders music including the song "Anyone Can Fall in Love".

Pat's Theme
On 31 December 2011, it was announced May had reworked the show's theme tune for Pat Evans (Pam St Clement) final EastEnders episode. The new version, called "Pat's Theme", played out at the end of the character's last episode broadcast on 1 January 2012. An EastEnders spokesperson told Daniel Kilkelly of Digital Spy, "It's only right that as we say goodbye to the iconic Pat Butcher we pay tribute to such a character with a wonderfully touching special theme tune." The theme features a piano and no other instruments. It was also used as the opening theme to a documentary show, EastEnders: Farewell Pat, that aired on BBC1 the following day.

Jubilee Theme
A new version of the theme tune was commissioned for the Platinum Jubilee of Elizabeth II and appearance of Charles, Prince of Wales and Camilla, Duchess of Cornwall, broadcast on 2 June 2022. The theme begins with "God Save the Queen".

Dot's Theme
An arrangement entitled "Dot's Theme" is played on 12 December 2022 for the funeral of Dot Branning (June Brown). It plays while Dot's coffin is lowered into the ground at the end of the episode, continuing under an archive recording of Dot's voice and over the credits. "Dot's Theme" begins with the "Eventide" melody, before segueing into the "Julia's Theme" melody and finally the EastEnders main theme. The arrangement is led by piano and string instrumentation.

Legacy
The theme is an iconic piece of music in the UK. A 2000 UK poll named it as the sixth most popular TV theme of all time. In a 2008 poll by PRS for Music the EastEnders theme was found to be the most recognisable piece of music in the UK, beating the national anthem "God Save the Queen" as well as the theme tunes for Match of the Day and Coronation Street. Composer Simon May commented: "When EastEnders first appeared in 1985 it was such a great buzz walking down the street or being in a supermarket hearing people whistling or humming the theme. I've been amazingly lucky that thanks to the huge success of the show the theme is still popular and in the national psyche." The theme tune was used in the 2012 Summer Olympics opening ceremony.

References

Bibliography

External links
 Peggy's Theme

Television drama theme songs
Theme tune
Songs with music by Simon May
1984 songs